Kayque Luiz Pereira (born 12 July 2000), simply known as Kayque, is a Brazilian footballer who plays as a midfielder for Botafogo.

Club career
Kayque was born in Rio de Janeiro, and began his career with Nova Iguaçu at the age of eleven. He made his first team debut with the club on 11 January 2020, coming on as a second-half substitute in a 4–0 Campeonato Carioca home routing over America-RJ.

On 5 September 2020, after five more first team appearances for Nova Iguaçu, Kayque joined Botafogo on loan until the following February, and was initially assigned to the under-20 squad. He made his first team – and Série A – debut for Bota on 2 February 2021, replacing Cesinha in a 1–1 away draw against Palmeiras.

Kayque had his loan extended until the end of 2021, but suffered a thigh injury which kept him sidelined between the months of April and July. On 14 January 2022, his loan was again extended for another six months.

Career statistics

Honours
Botafogo
 Campeonato Brasileiro Série B: 2021

References

External links
 Botafogo profile 

2000 births
Living people
Footballers from Rio de Janeiro (city)
Brazilian footballers
Association football midfielders
Campeonato Brasileiro Série A players
Campeonato Brasileiro Série B players
Nova Iguaçu Futebol Clube players
Botafogo de Futebol e Regatas players